Joe Venuti,  regarded by some as the Father of Jazz Violin, enjoyed a recording career under his own billing that stretched from 1926 to 1978. Besides momentary lapses in the years after 1935 and one big gap from 1961 to 1967, this activity is practically continuous. But in his last decade, Joe effectively surpassed his prodigious 1926 to 1960 output in the sheer number of late recordings he made, transforming it into a large and bewildering legacy. For most listeners, a decent collection drawn from the years 1926 to 1935 is sufficient, and the number of compilations derived from that period nearly equals the number of original 78 rpm record releases themselves.

This discography organizes original discs/LPs/CDs in issue order with an emphasis on reflecting the recordings as they might be found in the field. Secondary, non-commercial issues and unissued items are not included, except in cases where a secondary issue contains a different coupling, or when no issue can be considered "primary," as in the case of dime-store labels. Matrix numbers are not included, but this information is provided when multiple takes of a title are available. Corrections are welcome, especially when it comes to specific billing on a label or the verbatim appearance of titles. However, any rearrangement into strict chronological order in a track-based economy or by session—such as is common in traditional discography—is discouraged, as it would defeat the purpose of this listing and tend to duplicate work found elsewhere. The issue order does not automatically reflect strict chronological order of recording.

This discography does not include 78-era guest appearances by Venuti on records billed to other artists. For these, please visit the listings in Mosaic Records' The Classic Columbia and OKeh Joe Venuti and Eddie Lang Sessions Discography and in the entry for Venuti in Tom Lord's The Jazz Discography. Those principally interested in the career of Venuti's longtime collaborator Eddie Lang may wish to consult the excellent discography at Eddie Lang Sessions. In the case of mixed issues where a Venuti side is coupled with another artist, the other artist's name is included, but not the title of the piece performed.

78 rpm issues (1926–1950)

Eddie Lang dies March 26, 1933

Mono LP and corresponding CD issues (1948–1960)

Stereo LP and corresponding CD issues (1968–1998)

Guest appearances on LP and CD (1948–2005)

Reissues on LP and CD from 78rpm era material (1953–present)

See also
 
 Jazz violin
 Eddie Lang
 Adrian Rollini
 Jimmy Dorsey
 Tommy Dorsey
 Paul Whiteman
 Bing Crosby
 Phil Napoleon
 Louis Prima
 Russ Morgan
 Kay Starr
 Les Paul
 Robert Maxwell
 Tempo Records
 Tony Romano
 Dutch Swing College Band
 Marian McPartland
 Zoot Sims
 George Barnes
 Earl Hines
 Dave McKenna
 Eldon Shamblin
 Curly Chalker
 Jethro Burns
 Ross Tompkins

References

External links
 The Classic Columbia and OKeh Joe Venuti and Eddie Lang sessions Discography
 Red Hot Jazz Archive
 All Music Guide
 Charles Garrod: Joe Venuti and His Orchestra. Joyce Record Club, Portland, Oregon, 1993
 Anonymous: "Promotion at Rapid Tempo: Philco Places 500G Order As Freebies to Distribs." Billboard, April 28, 1951
 Anonymous: "Tempo Platters to Hit Market in June at $5." Billboard, June 5, 1948

Jazz discographies
Discographies of American artists